Kunene or Cunene may refer to:

Geography 
Kunene River (also spelled Cunene), in Angola and Namibia
Kunene Region, in Namibia
Cunene Province, in Angola

People 
Kenny Kunene, South African businessman
Mazisi Kunene, South African poet and historian